Outer membrane porin D is a protein family containing bacterial outer membrane porins which are involved in transport of cationic amino acids, peptides, antibiotics and other compounds.   
It was also described as having some serine protease activity. However many of these proteins are not peptidases and are classified as non-peptidase homologues as they either have been found experimentally to be without peptidase activity, or lack amino acid residues that are believed to be essential for the catalytic activity of peptidases in the S43 family.

References

Outer membrane proteins
Protein families